Eugen Baştină (born 27 January 1973) is a retired Romanian football player, and current coach. He made his debut as a player in Liga I on 30 March 1994 in a game between Farul Constanța and Petrolul Ploiești finished 0–0. Between January and September 2012, he was the manager of Liga II team Dunărea Galați.

Honours
 Zimbru Chişinău
 Moldovan Cup: 2002–03

External links

1973 births
Living people
Sportspeople from Ploiești
Romanian footballers
Association football midfielders
ASC Oțelul Galați players
FC Petrolul Ploiești players
FC U Craiova 1948 players
Liga I players
FC Zimbru Chișinău players
Romanian football managers
Romanian expatriate footballers
Expatriate footballers in Moldova